Shades of Bud Powell is the third solo album by trumpeter Herb Robertson. Featuring compositions by pianist Bud Powell arranged for a brass ensemble, the album was recorded in 1988 and released on the JMT label.

Reception
The AllMusic review by Michael G. Nastos states, "Extraordinary date from this trumpeter and the All-Star Sextet on an all-Powell program, creatively arranged. Excellent beyond words".

Track listing
All compositions by Bud Powell except as indicated
 "Un Poco Loco" - 5:37   
 "I'll Keep Loving You" - 6:54   
 "Hallucinations" - 9:41   
 "Glass Enclosure" - 5:29   
 "The Fruit" - 4:30   
 "Shades of Bud" (Herb Robertson) - 12:29

Personnel
Herb Robertson - trumpet, flugelhorn
Brian Lynch - trumpet
Vincent Chancey - French horn
Robin Eubanks - trombone
Bob Stewart - tuba
Joey Baron - drums, percussion

References 

1988 albums
Herb Robertson albums
JMT Records albums
Winter & Winter Records albums